The 1999 Arab Club Champions Cup was played in Egypt in the city of Cairo. Al Shabab won the championship for the second time beating in the final Al-Jaish.

Participants

Preliminary round

Zone 1 (Gulf Area)
Qualification from GCC Champions League held in Jeddah in 1999.

Al-Ittihad withdrew. West Riffa SC & Al-Salmiya advanced to the final tournament.

Zone 2 (Red Sea)
Qualifying tournament held in Abha.

Al Shabab advanced to the final tournament.

Zone 3 (North Africa)
Al-Mahalla disqualified by UAFA. ASC Sonalec withdrew.

Olympique Béja advanced automatically to the final tournament.

Zone 4 (East Region)
Qualifying tournament held in Amman.

Al-Wehdat & Al-Jaish advanced to the final tournament.

Final tournament

Group stage
The eight teams were drawn into two groups of four. Each group was played on one leg basis. The winners and runners-up of each group advanced to the semi-finals.

Group A

Group B

Knockout stage

Semi-finals

Final

Winners

References

External links
14th Arab Club Champions Cup 1999 – rsssf.com

1999
1999 in African football
1999 in Asian football
International association football competitions hosted by Egypt